The Asir Mountains (('Difficult')) is a mountainous region in southwestern Saudi Arabia running parallel to the Red Sea. It comprises areas in the Asir Region of Saudi Arabia, however it also generally includes areas near the Yemeni border. Sensu lato, they are part of the Sarawat Mountains, defining the latter as the mountain range which runs parallel to the Tihamah throughout the western portion of the Arabian Peninsula, particularly the western parts of Saudi Arabia and Yemen.

Geology

The mountains consist primarily of sedimentary rock, limestone, sandstone and shale, of Jurassic, Cretaceous and Paleogene origin on a Precambrian granitic basement.

Climate and agriculture
The region has the highest average rainfall of Saudi Arabia due to largely seasonal rain.

The region's crops, most of which are cultivated on steeply terraced mountainsides, include wheat, coffee, cotton, indigo, ginger, vegetables, and palms. The region also supports cattle, sheep, goats, and camels.

Biodiversity

The region's difficult terrain has helped preserve the region's unique biodiversity. Several new Myxomycetes fungi species have been discovered in the region, as have a variety of previously undiscovered plants. Asir is also thought to be one of the last natural habitats of the Arabian leopard. and also the Asir magpie, believed to be down to its last 135 pairs.

Gallery

See also

 Geography of Saudi Arabia
 List of mountains in Saudi Arabia
 Wildlife of Saudi Arabia
 Arabian leopard
 Hamadryas baboon
 Asir magpie
 Wildlife of Yemen

References

Further reading
 A Journey Through the Tihama, the 'Asir, and the Hijaz Mountains, by Wilfred Thesiger

Mountain ranges of Saudi Arabia
'Asir Province
Southwestern Arabian foothills savanna